Jérôme de La Gorce (born 1951 in Paris) is a French art historian and musicologist. He is a specialist in dramatic music and performing arts in France in the 17th and 18th centuries.

Career 
After having followed a double university course, he defended a thesis dedicated to the "marvelous in the opera under the reign of Louis XIV".

Publications 
1986: Jean Bérain the Elder, dessinateur du Roi Soleil, Paris, Herscher
1991: Marin Marais (with Sylvette Milliot), Paris, Fayard
1992: L'Opéra à Paris au temps de Louis XIV : histoire d'un théâtre, Desjonquères
1997: Féeries d’opéra : décors, machines et costumes en France (1645–1765), Paris, éditions du Patrimoine
2002: Jean-Baptiste Lully, Paris, Fayard, 
2005: Carlo Vigarani, intendant des plaisirs de Louis XIV, Perrin

References

External links 
 Entretien avec Jérôme de la Gorce on Muse Baroque
 Jérôme de la Gorce on France Musique
 Jérôme de la Gorce: Les grandes fêtes parisiennes et leur rivalité avec celles de Versailles on YouTube

1951 births
Living people
Academic staff of Paris-Sorbonne University
20th-century French musicologists
21st-century French musicologists
French art historians
Chevaliers of the Ordre des Arts et des Lettres